Ayn al-Sharqiyah (also spelled Ain esh-Sharqiye) is a town in northwestern Syria, administratively part of the Jableh District in the Latakia Governorate, located southeast of Latakia. Nearby localities include Siyano to the northwest, Zama to the north, Ayn al-Kurum to the northeast, Beit Yashout to the east, Nahr al-Bared to the southeast, Daliyah to the south, Dweir Baabda, Baniyas and Arab al-Mulk to the southwest. According to the Syria Central Bureau of Statistics, Ayn al-Sharqiyah had a population of 2,359 in the 2004 census. It is the administrative center of a nahiyah ("sub-district") containing 22 localities which had a collective population of 16,800 in 2004. Its inhabitants are predominantly Alawites.

References

Populated places in Jableh District
Towns in Syria
Alawite communities in Syria